Anthurium magnificum is a plant in the genus Anthurium native to Colombia. Closely resembling other Anthurium species like Anthurium crystallinum, it has large, cordate leaves with prominent veining and is primarily terrestrial. Plants of the true species can be distinguished primarily by their quadrangular petioles.

References

magnificum
Flora of Colombia
Plants described in 1865